Klassikokkutulek (English: Class Reunion) is a 2016 Estonian comedy film directed by René Vilbre.

Cast 
 Mait Malmsten - Mart
 Ago Anderson - Andres
 G-Enka - Toomas
 Maarja Jakobson - Juta
 Franz Malmsten - Joonas
 Märt Pius - Young boss
 Arvi Mägi - Doctor
 Gerli Rosenfeld - Tüdruk
 Maris Kõrvits - Lea
 Sofia Fe Soe - Saara
 Kadri Adamson - Anne 
 Mart Müürisepp - Ken-Priidik
 Kristjan Lüüs - Young man
 Britta Soll - Sperm clinic doctor
 Mari Lill – Old woman
 Karin Rask – Simone
 Grete Klein – Josefine
 Kristiina-Hortensia Port – Jane
 Leino Rei – Roland
 Ülle Lichtfeldt – Eva
 Martin Algus – Father
 Ciara Simone Pirn – Tütar
 Allan Kress – Olle
 Mait Trink – Peter
 Marika Korolev – Luule
 Karmel Eikner – Ulla 
 Kaja Plovits – Karin 
 Ene Järvis – History teacher
 Mari Lill – Old woman
 Nikolai Bentsler – Fat man

References

External links 
 

2016 comedy films
Estonian comedy films
Estonian-language films